Almena may refer to:

In the United States
 Almena, Kansas
 Almena, Wisconsin
 Almena (town), Wisconsin  
 Almena Township, Michigan

Elsewhere
 Almena, Extertal, Germany
 Almena, Spain